The Sind sardinella (Sardinella sindensis) is a species of ray-finned fish in the genus Sardinella.

They are found in the western Indian Ocean and the Arabian Sea.

References 

sindensis
Fish described in 1878